Chang Yao-sheng (born 1975) is a Taiwanese film director, novelist and screenwriter.

His screenwriting credits include The Village of No Return (2017) and A Sun (2019). 

By 2019, his screenplay for A Leg had won a NT$100,000 prize for scripts that not yet been produced at the Excellent Screenplay Awards, a ceremony organized by the Bureau of Audiovisual and Music Industry Development. A Leg became Chang's directorial debut, and alongside 's Classmates Minus, is to open the 57th Golden Horse Awards. A Leg is one of four Taiwanese films to be shown at the 2020 Tokyo International Film Festival.

References

External links

1975 births
Living people
Taiwanese male novelists
Taiwanese screenwriters
21st-century Taiwanese writers
21st-century novelists
Taiwanese film directors